Thomas B. Wells (born Ohio, 1945) is an American lawyer who serves as a senior judge of the United States Tax Court.

Wells received a Bachelor of Science from Miami University of Ohio in 1967. He was a Supply Corps Officer on active duty in the U.S. Naval Reserve from 1967–1970, stationed in Morocco and Vietnam, and received a Joint Service Commendation Medal.

After leaving the military, Wells returned to school, earning a J.D. from Emory University Law School in 1973, and a Master of Laws in Taxation from New York University Law School in 1978.

Admitted to practice law in Georgia; member of law firm of Graham and Wells, P.C.; County Attorney for Toombs County, Georgia; City Attorney, Vidalia, Georgia, until 1977; member of law firm of Hurt, Richardson, Garner, Todd and Cadenhead, Atlanta, until 1981; law firm of Shearer and Wells, P.C., until 1986; member of American Bar Association, Section of Taxation; State Bar of Georgia, member of Board of Governors; Board of Editors, Georgia State Bar Journal; member Atlanta Bar Association; Editor of the Atlanta Lawyer; active in various tax organizations, such as Atlanta Tax Forum, presently, Honorary Member; Director, Atlanta Estate Planning Council; Director, North Atlanta Tax Council; American College of Tax Counsel, Honorary Fellow; Emory Law Alumni Association's Distinguished Alumnus Award, 2001; Life Member, National Eagle Scout Association, Eagle Scout, 1960. Member, Metropolitan Club; Chevy Chase Club, Vidalia Kiwanis Club, President, recipient Distinguished President Award.

Wells was appointed by President Ronald Reagan as a judge United States Tax Court on October 13, 1986 for a term ending October 12, 2001. He was reappointed by President George W. Bush on October 10, 2001 for a term ending October 9, 2016. He served as chief judge from September 24, 1997 to November 6, 1997 and from June 1, 2000 to May 31, 2004.

Attribution
Material on this page was copied from the website of the United States Tax Court, which is published by a United States government agency, and is therefore in the public domain.

1945 births
Living people
20th-century American judges
21st-century American judges
Emory University alumni
Judges of the United States Tax Court
Miami University alumni
People from Vidalia, Georgia
United States Article I federal judges appointed by George W. Bush
United States Article I federal judges appointed by Ronald Reagan
United States Navy officers